Sepako is a village in Central District of Botswana. The population was 627 in 2001 census.

References

Populated places in Central District (Botswana)
Villages in Botswana